Virchow's triad or the triad of Virchow describes the three broad categories of factors that are thought to contribute to thrombosis. 
Hypercoagulability
Hemodynamic changes (stasis, turbulence)
Endothelial injury/dysfunction
 
It is named after the renowned German physician Rudolf Virchow (1821-1902). However, the elements comprising Virchow's triad were not proposed by Virchow. Neither did he ever suggest a triad to describe the pathogenesis of venous thrombosis. In fact, it was not until decades after Virchow's death that a consensus was reached proposing that thrombosis is the result of alterations in blood flow, vascular endothelial injury, or alterations in the constitution of the blood. Still, the modern understanding of the factors leading to embolism is similar to the description provided by Virchow. Virchow's triad remains a useful concept for clinicians and pathologists alike in understanding the contributors to thrombosis.


The triad
The triad consists of three components:

History
The origin of the term "Virchow's Triad" is of historical interest, and has been subject to reinterpretation in recent years. While both Virchow's and the modern triads describe thrombosis, the previous triad has been characterized as "the consequences of thrombosis", and the modern triad as "the causes of thrombosis".

Rudolf Virchow elucidated the etiology of pulmonary embolism, whereby thrombi occurring within the veins, particularly those of the extremities, become dislodged and migrate to the pulmonary vasculature. He published his description in 1856.  In detailing the pathophysiology surrounding pulmonary embolism, he alluded to many of the factors known to contribute to venous thrombosis.  While these factors had already been previously established in the medical literature by others, for unclear reasons they ultimately became known as Virchow's triad.  This eponym did not emerge in the literature until long after Virchow's death. One estimate of the first use of the phrase dates it to the early 1950s.

Although the concept of the triad is usually attributed to Virchow, he did not include endothelial injury in his description. This has been attributed to a dispute Virchow had with Jean Cruveilhier, who considered local trauma of primary importance in the development of pulmonary artery thrombosis.

References

Hematology
Rudolf Virchow
Medical triads